The 1976 Miami Toros season was the fourth season of the team, and the club's tenth season in professional soccer.  This year, the team finished in fifth place of the Eastern Division and did not qualify for the North American Soccer League playoffs.  At the end of the year, the club folded the team and moved to Fort Lauderdale, fielding a new team known as the Fort Lauderdale Strikers for the 1977 season.

Background

Review

Competitions

NASL regular season

Regular season
W = Wins, L = Losses, GF = Goals For, GA = Goals Against, PT= point system

6 points for a win,
1 point for a shootout win,
0 points for a loss,
1 point for each regulation goal scored up to three per game.

Atlantic Conference

Results summaries

Results by round

Match reports

Statistics

Transfers

See also 
1976 Miami Toros

References 

1976
Miami
Miami
Miami Toros